Newstone Capital Partners is a firm that provides debt capital to private equity sponsors pursuing leveraged buyouts, recapitalizations and later-stage growth financing. The firm has approximately $1.7 billion of assets under management.

The firm, which was founded in 2006, is based in Los Angeles and has offices in Dallas.

History
In 2006, TCW/Crescent Mezzanine professionals John Rocchio and Timothy Costello left TCW to launch the new firm, Newstone Capital Partners, with approximately $865 million of investor capital committed to its debut fund.

References

External links

Newstone Capital Partners (company website)

Private equity firms of the United States
Mezzanine capital investment firms
Companies based in Los Angeles
Financial services companies established in 2006